The following is a list of the 198 communes of the Alpes-de-Haute-Provence department of France.

The communes cooperate in the following intercommunalities (as of 2020):
Communauté d'agglomération Durance-Luberon-Verdon Agglomération (partly)
Communauté d'agglomération Gap-Tallard-Durance (partly)
Communauté d'agglomération Provence-Alpes
Communauté de communes Alpes Provence Verdon - Sources de Lumière
Communauté de communes Haute-Provence Pays de Banon
Communauté de communes Jabron Lure Vançon Durance (partly)
Communauté de communes Pays d'Apt-Luberon (partly)
Communauté de communes Pays de Forcalquier - Montagne de Lure
Communauté de communes de Serre-Ponçon (partly)
Communauté de communes Serre-Ponçon Val d'Avance (partly)
Communauté de communes du Sisteronais Buëch (partly)
Communauté de communes Vallée de l'Ubaye Serre-Ponçon

References

Alpes-de-Haute-Provence